Autophobia, also called monophobia, isolophobia, or eremophobia, is the specific phobia or a morbid fear or dread of oneself or of being alone, isolated, abandoned, and ignored. This specific phobia is associated with the idea of being alone, causing severe anxiety

Those with this condition suffer in a range of situations, both in solitude and in company of others. Isolated, people with autophobia struggle with a fear of inability to handle challenges by themselves. On the other hand, those with this condition may still struggle in fear of abandonment and maintaining relationships even when those people are physically present. Thus, individuals with autophobia struggle in their relationships, mental health, physical health, employment, and personal growth.

Contrary to what would be inferred by a literal reading of the term, autophobia does not describe a "fear of oneself" nor is it the fear of automobiles (despite various cultures abbreviating automobile to "auto"). It typically develops from and is associated with personal trauma, anxiety, depression or other disorders.

Autophobia can be associated with or accompanied by other phobias, such as agoraphobia, and is generally considered part of the agoraphobic cluster, meaning that it has many of the same characteristics as certain anxiety disorders and hyperventilation disorders. The main concern of people with phobias in the agoraphobic cluster is their ability to get help in case of emergency. This often makes them afraid of going out in public, being caught in crowds, being alone, or being stranded.

Autophobia is not to be confused with agoraphobia (fear of being in public or being caught in crowds), self-hatred, or social anxiety, although it can be closely related to them. It is a distinct phobia that tends to be accompanied or linked with other anxiety disorders, trauma syndromes, mental health issues or phobias.

Signs and symptoms 
The symptoms of autophobia vary by case. However, there are some symptoms that a multitude of people with this disease have. An intense amount of apprehension and anxiety when you are alone or think about situations where you would be secluded is one of the most common indications that a person is autophobic. People with this disorder also commonly believe that there is an impending disaster waiting to occur whenever they are left alone. For this reason, autophobes go to extreme lengths to avoid being in isolation. However, people with this disease often do not need to be in physical isolation to feel abandoned. Autophobes will often be in a crowded area or group of people and feel as though they are completely secluded.

There has also been some connection to autophobia being diagnosed in people who also have borderline personality disorders.

Below is a list of other symptoms that are sometimes associated with autophobia:
 Mental symptoms:
 Fear of fainting
 A disability to concentrate on anything other than the disease
 Fear of losing your mind
 Failure to think clearly
 Emotional symptoms:
 Stress over up-coming times and places where you may be alone
 Fear of being secluded
 Physical symptoms:
 Lightheadedness, dizziness
 Sweating
 Shaking 
 Nausea
 Cold and hot flashes
 Numbness or tingling feelings
 Dry mouth
 Increased heart rate
Not moving when isolated 
shaking hands and legs

Background 
Autophobia can be derived from social anxiety. When people with this phobia are left alone, they will often experience panic attacks, which is a common reaction in those with social anxiety. This disease can also stem from depression because when people become seriously autophobic, they start to find certain tasks and activities almost impossible to complete. This usually occurs when autophobes are faced with a possibility of going into a public place where there are many people or simply a place that is uncomfortable or unfamiliar to them. This phobia can also be closely related to agoraphobia, which leads to lowered self-confidence and uncertainty of their ability to finish certain activities that need to be done alone. People with this phobia tend to imagine the worst possible scenario. For example, they might have a panic attack and then think that they are going to die from this event.

Another experience that doctors believe leads individuals to develop this phobia is children being abandoned, usually by their parents, when they are very young. This first causes childhood trauma that then persists to affect them as they grow up. This turns into autophobia because they are now afraid that all of the important people in their lives are going to leave or abandon them. Therefore, this particular phobia can come from behavior and experiences that these people have had when they were growing up. However, abandonment does not necessarily mean being left alone physically, this also includes being isolated financially or emotionally. Having drastic, life-altering experiences, particularly causes more trauma which makes this phobia worse. People that have very high anxiety and in this case are more "high strung," are more susceptible to this phobia.

Although this phobia is often developed at a young age, it can develop later in life as well. Individuals sometimes develop this fear with the death of a loved one or the ending of an important relationship. Autophobia can also be described as the fear of being without a specific person. Tragic events in a person's life may create this fear of being without one specific person, but this often will eventually progress into a fear of being secluded in general.

Diagnosis

Definitions 
Autophobia is closely related to monophobia, isolophobia, and eremophobia. However, it varies slightly in definition. According to the Merriam-Webster Medical Dictionary, eremophobia is a morbid fear of being isolated. In contrast, The Practitioner's Medical Dictionary defines autophobia as a morbid fear of solitude or one's self.

Treatments 
Autophobia is a form of anxiety that can cause a minor to extreme feeling of danger or fear when alone. There is not a specific treatment to cure autophobia as it affects each person differently. Most people with the condition are treated with psychotherapy in which the amount of time that they are alone is slowly increased. There are no conclusive studies currently that support any medications being used as treatment. If the anxiety is too intense, medications have been used to aid the patient in a continuation of the therapy.

It is not uncommon for affected people to be unaware that they have this anxiety and to dismiss the idea of seeking help. Much like substance abuse, autophobia is mental and physical and requires assistance from a medical professional. Medication can be used to stabilize symptoms and inhibit further substance abuse. Group and individual therapy is used to help ease symptoms and treat the phobia.

In mild cases of autophobia, treatment can sometimes be very simple. Therapists recommend many different remedies to make patients feel as though they are not alone even when that is the case, such as listening to music when running errands alone or turning on the television when at home, even if it is just for background noise. Using noise to interrupt the silence of isolated situations can often be a great help for people with autophobia.

However, it is important to remember that just because a person may feel alone at times does not mean that they have autophobia. Most people feel alone and secluded at times; this is not an unusual phenomenon. Only when the fear of being alone begins to interrupt how a person lives their daily life does the idea of being autophobic become a possibility.

Research 
In an article called "Psychogenic Hyperventilation and Death Anxiety" by Herbert R. Lazarus, M.D., and John J. Kostan, Jr., M.S.W., autophobia or monophobia was referred to as being very closely related to death anxiety, or a feeling of impending doom. A patient might feel dread so strongly because of autophobia that they may hyperventilate and feel like they may die because of it. It is also noted that patients with hyperventilation and death anxiety might also develop or have autophobia because they are so afraid of dying, getting seriously injured, or otherwise find themselves in a dire situation, that they become deathly afraid of being alone. Without somebody to help them in case they need it, autophobia-induced anxiety may occur along with other anxieties or phobias included in the agoraphobic cluster.

Cultural references 
A comic was written on Tapastic called Autophobia in which a boy with a rocky family life navigates high school.

In July 2018, Canadian musician deadmau5 released a song named Monophobia, featuring vocals from Rob Swire, with lyrics vaguely referring to the condition.

A Telugu movie named Atithidevo Bhavah is released on this concept.

See also 
 Agoraphobia (fear of large crowds)
 Borderline personality disorder
 Dependent personality disorder
 Narcissism

References 

Agoraphobia
Phobias